Pyrimidinediones are a class of chemical compounds characterized by a pyrimidine ring substituted with two carbonyl groups.

Examples include naturally occurring metabolites:

drugs:

 Fluorouracil
 Idoxuridine
 Primidone
 Trifluridine
and pesticides:
 Bromacil
 Saflufenacil

References